The canton of Quimperlé is an administrative division of the Finistère department, northwestern France. Its borders were modified at the French canton reorganisation which came into effect in March 2015. Its seat is in Quimperlé.

It consists of the following communes:
 
Arzano
Baye
Clohars-Carnoët
Guilligomarc'h
Locunolé
Mellac
Querrien
Quimperlé
Rédené
Saint-Thurien
Tréméven

References

Cantons of Finistère